Nilo de Oliveira Pereira (11 December 1909, in Ceará-Mirim – 23 January 1992, in Recife) was a Brazilian journalist and teacher.

He graduated in law at the Faculty of Law of Recife in 1932, but practiced law only briefly.

Journalist 
He exercised journalism in the following periodicals:
 Diário de Natal
 A República
 O Estado
 Tribuna do Norte
 Folha da Manha (he was editor in chief)
 Jornal Pequeno
 The Tribune
 Jornal do Commercio (Recife)
 Jornal do Commercio (Rio de Janeiro)
 Diário de Pernambuco

Literary life 
He was a member of the following literary and cultural institutions:

 Academia Pernambucana de Letras (Chair 16)
 Instituto Arqueológico, Histórico e Geográrico Pernambucano

Books published 
 Camões e Nabuco(1949);
 Revisionismo e tradição (1950);
 Dom Vital e a questão religiosa no Brasil (1966);
 Conflitos entre a Igreja e o Estado no Brasil (1970);
 Espírito de província (1970);
 Ensaios de história regional (1972);
 Agamenon Magalhães: uma evocação pessoal (1973);
 O tempo mágico (1975);
 A Faculdade de Direito do Recife, 1927-1977 (1977);
 Um tempo do Recife (1978);
 Reflexões de um fim de século (1979);
 Igreja e Estado: relações difíceis (1982);
 Iniciação ao jornalismo: pesquisa histórica (1982);
 A rosa verde: crônica quase romance (1982);
 Pernambucanidade: alguns aspectos históricos (1983);
 Gilberto Freyre visto de perto (1986);
 Mauro Mota e o seu tempo (1987);
 Profissionais de Pernambuco (1989);
 O Estado Novo em Pernambuco (1989);
  (1990);

Awards 
 Professor Emeritus and Honorary Doctorate from the University Federal de Pernambuco [2];
 Doctor Honoris Causa from the Federal University of Rio Grande do Norte;
 Carneiro Vilela Medal of Pernambuco Academy of Letters
 Prêmio Machado de Assis of Brazilian Academy of Letters.

References

External links 
 Nilo Pereira
 About Museu Nilo Pereira
 Enciclopédia Nordeste - Nilo Pereira

1909 births
1992 deaths
Brazilian journalists
People from Ceará-Mirim
20th-century journalists